Thint Myaat (born April 14, 2002) is a Burmese swimmer. He competed at the 2016 Summer Olympics in the men's 100 metre butterfly event; his time of 1:02.54 in the heats did not qualify him for the semifinals.

References

External links
 

2002 births
Living people
Burmese male swimmers
Olympic swimmers of Myanmar
Swimmers at the 2016 Summer Olympics
Male butterfly swimmers